Legalise Drugs & Murder is the fifth EP by English doom metal band Electric Wizard. It was released in March 2012.

Background
On 1 October 2012 Electric Wizard issued the EP in a cassette form that came bundled with issue #228 of Terrorizer Magazine. This version contained four additional tracks. One of the songs, a 2012 remastered demo of "Satyr IX" from Black Masses, was released as a flexi disc for issue #94 of Decibel Magazine on 1 August 2012. "Patterns of Evil" is an alternate mix from the song on Black Masses. "Lucifer (We've Gone Too Far)" and "Our Witchcult Grows..." are unreleased outtakes.

On 23 June 2016 it was re-issued on 12" EP via Witchfinder Records.

Track listing

Personnel

Electric Wizard
 Jus Oborn – guitar, bass on tracks 1, 2 ,4 & 5, vocals on tracks 1-5
 Liz Buckingham – guitar on tracks 1-5
 Shaun Rutter – drums on "Satyr IX" & "Patterns of Evil"
 Andrew Prestige – drums on "Legalise Drugs and Murder" & "Murder & Madness"
 William Palmer – bass on "Legalise Drugs and Murder"

Production and Art
 Jus Oborn – art, layout and design

References

2010 EPs
Electric Wizard EPs
Rise Above Records albums